Hassan Abujihaad (born Paul R. Hall; 1976) is a former sailor in the United States Navy convicted of supporting terrorism.

A native of Phoenix, Arizona and a convert to Islam, Abujihaad was convicted of disclosing the location of Navy ships and their weaknesses to an online forum in April 2001 while serving as a naval signalman on board the USS Benfold.

Early life
Abujihaad grew up in Southern California. He legally changed his name from Paul Raphael Hall to Hassan Abujihaad in 1997, and enlisted in the Navy in January 1998. He was honorably discharged in 2002.

Abujihaad married Takia Haji in 2000. He filed for divorce in 2005 and was awarded sole custody of their two children during the following year. He occasionally attended the Islamic Community Center of Phoenix, which is also the mosque that Elton Simpson, one of the gunmen shot dead in the attempted Curtis Culwell Center attack of May 2015, attended.

Arrest, trial, and conviction
Police arrested Abujihaad in March 2007 in Phoenix, Arizona. He entered a plea of not guilty on April 4, 2007. On March 5, 2008, he was convicted by a jury in New Haven, Connecticut. Federal prosecutors said the then-32-year-old had admitted disclosing military intelligence. He was sentenced to ten years in prison, the maximum penalty for the crime.

In 2009, the Sunday Mercury reported that Abujihaad's first link to terrorism came at the Maktabah Al Ansar bookstore in Sparkhill, Birmingham, England.

References

External links
 FBI Hassan Abu-Jihaad conviction, fbi.gov, March 10, 2008

1976 births
Living people
Converts to Islam
United States Navy sailors
American people imprisoned on charges of terrorism
Islamic terrorism in the United States
Date of birth missing (living people)
Place of birth missing (living people)
Military personnel from Phoenix, Arizona
African-American Muslims
People from San Bernardino, California